Fred Fassert (born 1935) is most famously known as the writer of the popular song "Barbara Ann," which was originally written for the band he was in at the time, The Regents. In 1961, the song reached #13 on the Billboard Hot 100 chart. It was covered by other artists, including the Beach Boys on their 1965 album, Beach Boys' Party!, with the single reaching #2 on the Billboard chart. Fassert wrote "Barbara Ann" for his sister, Barbara Ann Fassert. His brother, Chuck Fassert, was the original 2nd tenor of the Regents.

Vince Vance and the Valiants covered it with their 1980 hit song "Bomb Iran", inspired by the Iran hostage crisis of the previous year: this song indeed was set to the same tune, and the band credited Fassert as the composer.

External links
 Biography for Fred Fassert

1935 births
Living people
American male songwriters